Marcos Esteban Litre (born 14 September 1988) is an Argentine professional footballer who plays as a midfielder or forward for Deportivo Santaní.

Career
Litre signed for Olimpo from Sarmiento de Pigüe, with the player making his professional debut for Olimpo on 13 September 2008 during a Primera B Nacional home victory over San Martín. He scored his first goal three weeks later against Tiro Federal. Olimpo won promotion to the Primera División in 2009–10, with Litre netting his first top-flight goal in April 2011 versus Colón. Litre left Olimpo in 2012, joining Gimnasia y Esgrima and subsequently former team Sarmiento de Pigüe. One year later, Litre completed a move to Torneo Argentino A's Juventud Antoniana. He scored four goals in forty-five matches across two seasons.

2015 saw Litre feature for Sarmiento de Pigüe (third spell) and Villa Mitre, which preceded a 2016 move to Sol de América. Four goals followed, including two against Sportivo Patria in April 2016. Litre rejoined Juventud Antoniana on 30 June 2016. After twenty-seven games and one goal, he departed for a second time in July 2017 after agreeing to join Alvarado. His first goal for the club arrived on 8 October against Deportivo Madryn, which was the first of six goals in the 2017–18 Torneo Federal A campaign. On 30 June 2018, Primera B Nacional side Almagro signed Litre. One goal in eighteen games in all competitions came.

In July 2019, Deportivo Santaní of the Paraguayan Primera División secured terms with Litre. He netted twice on his official bow, on 18 July in the Copa Paraguay over Sud América.

Career statistics
.

References

External links

1988 births
Living people
Sportspeople from Buenos Aires Province
Argentine footballers
Association football midfielders
Association football forwards
Argentine expatriate footballers
Expatriate footballers in Paraguay
Argentine expatriate sportspeople in Paraguay
Primera Nacional players
Argentine Primera División players
Torneo Argentino B players
Torneo Argentino A players
Torneo Federal A players
Olimpo footballers
Gimnasia y Esgrima de Mendoza footballers
Juventud Antoniana footballers
Villa Mitre footballers
Sol de América de Formosa players
Club Atlético Alvarado players
Club Almagro players
Deportivo Santaní players